Abdul Baqi Haqqani Bashir Mohammad, or Abdul Baqi Haqqani (born ) is an Afghan and senior member of the Taliban. He became acting Higher Education Minister of the Islamic Emirate of Afghanistan following the Fall of Kabul in August 2021.

Childhood
Abdul Baqi Haqqani was born in Jalalabad around 1960–1962.

Administrative career

Islamic Emirate (1996–2001)
During the Islamic Emirate of Afghanistan (1996–2001), Abdul Baqi held positions as governor of Khost and Paktika Provinces and vice-minister of Information and Culture, and worked in the Consulate Department of the Ministry of Foreign Affairs.

Islamic Emirate (2021–present)

In August 2021, following the Fall of Kabul, Abdul Baqi became acting Higher Education Minister. He stated that women had the right to study but that women students would study in separate classrooms to men students.

Sanctions
In 2012, Abdul Baqi was listed for sanctions by the European Union on the grounds of his administrative role in the Islamic Emirate, for "anti-government military activities" in 2003, and for "organising militant activities" in 2009.

References

Living people
Taliban leaders
Taliban governors
People from Jalalabad
1961 births
Governors of Khost Province
Governors of Paktika Province
Taliban government ministers of Afghanistan